St George's Barracks was a military installation in Orange Street, behind the National Gallery, in London.

History
The barracks, which were designed by John Nash and built as the main recruiting depot for the London area, were completed in 1826. Recruiting sergeants for the regiments based at the barracks tended to operate within a tight area defined by St. George's Barracks, Trafalgar Square and Westminster Abbey. The barracks, which were also used as facilities to accommodate regiments of foot guards, were retained into the 20th century because of the need for troops to be at hand to quell disturbances in Trafalgar Square. They were ultimately demolished in 1911 and the site is now occupied by the National Portrait Gallery.

References

Sources

Barracks in London
Installations of the British Army
Demolished buildings and structures in London
Buildings and structures demolished in 1911